International American University is an offshore private medical school located in Vieux Fort, Saint Lucia in the Caribbean. The school's offshore office is located in Dallas, Texas.

The university is listed with the World Directory of Medical Schools (https://search.wdoms.org/) and with Europa World of Learning(http://www.worldoflearning.com/).

IAU is recognized by ECFMG, the Medical Council of Canada, Medical Council of India and the St. Lucian Medical and Dental Council. The University is registered with the Ministry of Education in St. Lucia.

The University is also a member of the Association of Commonwealth Universities (ACU).

See also
 International medical graduate
 List of medical schools in the Caribbean

References

External links
 

Universities and colleges in Saint Lucia
Vieux Fort, Saint Lucia
Medical schools in the Caribbean
2003 establishments in Saint Lucia